Ugachick Limited, whose complete name is Ugachick Poultry Breeders Uganda Limited, but is commonly referred to as Ugachick, is a poultry breeding and marketing company in Uganda.

Location
The coordinates of the company headquarters are: 0°29'23.0"N, 32°36'13.0"E (Latitude:0.489722; Longitude:32.603615).

Overview
Ugachick Limited was established in 1992. The business is divided into five divisions:

 Feed Mill - Supplies feeds to other divisions in the business and other farmers in Uganda and the region
 Parent Stock Farm - Adult layer birds for laying eggs 
 Hatchery - For hatching of chicks for sale 
 Broiler Farm - Raising adult birds for meat
 Processing plant - Prepares chicken meat for sale in Ugandan supermarkets and other customers in neighbouring countries

See also
 List of wealthiest people in Uganda

References

External links
Poultry industry in Uganda revamped - 27 September 2011

Food and drink companies of Uganda
Poultry companies
Agriculture in Uganda
Wakiso District
1992 establishments in Uganda